is an amateur flight simulator video game developed and published by Nintendo for the Super Nintendo Entertainment System. The game was originally released in Japan in December 1990, shortly after the launch of the Super Famicom in the country. It was also released as a launch title for the SNES in August 1991 in North America, with a European release following in 1992.

In Pilotwings, the player attempts to earn pilot licenses through lessons in light plane flight, hang gliding, skydiving, and the use of a rocket belt. Bonus stages and levels involving an attack helicopter are also available. Each event offers unique controls and gameplay mechanics. To increase the realism of the game's flight simulation, the developers extensively utilized the SNES's Mode 7 capability, which mimics 3D graphics by rotating and scaling flat objects.

The game was well-received upon its release, largely thanks to its graphical presentation. The game has since been re-released for the Wii and Wii U Virtual Console and Nintendo Switch Online in PAL regions, North America, and Japan, as well as New Nintendo 3DS in North America. A sequel, Pilotwings 64, was released for the Nintendo 64 in 1996. After many years of announcements and cancellations, Nintendo released a second sequel, Pilotwings Resort, in 2011 for the Nintendo 3DS.

Gameplay
Pilotwings takes place in a series of training areas called the "Flight Club". The player's objective is to pass each training area and earn licenses based on the difficulty of the courses. Each area features events, which may be played in any order. In these events, the player controls one of four aerial vehicles and must complete a task (usually flying through floating markers) within a time limit. Upon completing or failing an objective, the player earns points and receives comments from the instructors. Points are awarded based on criteria such as the time taken to complete the event, the accuracy of the landing, and the completion of certain tasks, such as flying through colored rings or orbs. To pass a training area, the combined scores from each event must exceed a certain threshold. Each training area can be replayed if necessary, and passwords allow players to save their progress.

The first event, the light plane, requires the player to follow a guide path of orbs, or to fly through rings of orbs, and then land on the runway. In the second event, skydiving, the player jumps from a helicopter at a high altitude and maneuvers by leaning forward and back, and by rotating on a horizontal axis. The player must fall through rings of orbs in the sky before deploying the parachute, and must then attempt to land in a target area made up of concentric circles, with marks indicating the points awarded. The third event sees the player taking control of a rocket belt, which can be controlled with left and right yaw rotation, leaning forward and back to control speed. High and low levels of thrust allow high speed and finer control, respectively. The player must take off and fly through a series of rings, bars, or other objects before landing in a target area. The objective of the fourth event, hang gliding, is to catch thermal currents (represented by ascending white dots), reach a specified altitude, and then land as close as possible to the center of a gray square target.

Some events have bonus stages that add to a player's score, even if it has already reached the maximum number. In the skydiving, rocket belt, and hang glider modes, landing on moving platforms rewards players with a perfect score, and a bonus stage for extra points may be earned by falling into the water of a target area. These stages include maneuvering a diving penguin into a pool, bouncing a winged man across a series of trampolines, and flying another winged man as far as possible.

After completing the certification courses of all four instructors, the player is informed that an agent has infiltrated an enemy base ("EVIL Syndicate") on the fictional Izanu Island and has freed the player's kidnapped instructors, who are waiting to be rescued. The player's mission is to fly an attack helicopter from an offshore aircraft carrier and retrieve the captives by landing on a helipad on the island. This rescue mission stands out from the normal courses in that the player does more than maneuver a craft. As the player flies over the island, they must successfully dodge anti-aircraft fire from ground-based turrets, and, although the helicopter is able to fire missiles to destroy the artillery, a single hit to the craft causes the game to end. The helicopter has forward, backward, left, and right pitch controls, rotor throttle controls for altitude, and left and right missile firing controls. Completing the mission earns the player the "Pilot's Wings" certificate and opens more difficult training areas (consisting of several weather conditions and higher score requirements) and another helicopter mission. Clearing the second helicopter mission awards the player with the golden "Pilot's Wings," and the credits roll.

Development
Pilotwings was developed by Nintendo Entertainment Analysis and Development (EAD), a team consisting of members of the company's Research & Development divisions, under the leadership of producer Shigeru Miyamoto. Nintendo EAD completed Pilotwings and two other games (Super Mario World and F-Zero) within 15 months of the debut of the Super Nintendo Entertainment System. Pilotwings was released in Japan on December 21, 1990, one month after the system's launch, and was later released in North America in August 1991 as a launch title. The game's musical score was composed by Soyo Oka, while her superior Koji Kondo was responsible for the sound programming and the helicopter theme. Six tracks from the game, including a rearranged version of the skydiving theme, appeared on the Nintendo Super Famicom Game Music album, released in Japan on March 4, 1992. Six piano-arranged versions of songs from the game were included on the Nintendo Super Famicom Game Music: Fun Together with Beyer CD, which was released in Japan on November 30, 1993.

A flight simulator game resembling Pilotwings called Dragonfly was shown during the official unveiling of the SNES to the Japanese press on November 21, 1988. The game was used to demonstrate the system's Mode 7 graphics system, which allows rotation, scaling, and other effects to be used on flat images to create a 3D effect. Because the game does not use the coprocessor chip Super FX, the true Super NES 3D technology, the buildings, runway, trees, and so on are all "painted" flat on the ground plane, and they appear to stick out of the ground when the player's viewpoint is far above.

Reception and legacy

Pilotwings was positively received during both its initial release and in retrospective reviews. The game drew praise for its presentation, with publications describing the game's use of Mode 7 graphics as "stunning" and "jaw-dropping". Pilotwings was generally seen as a showpiece title for the Super NES, demonstrating its Mode 7 features, built-in sprite scaling, and high-end sound chip in a conspicuous manner. Its level of challenge was also positively noted; Mean Machines found that practicing the flight tests and reaching the end of the game was very rewarding. Official Nintendo Magazine remarked in 2009, "This early SNES title is still enjoyable enough to be considered a true classic."

In February 2006, Pilotwings was listed as the 153rd best game on a Nintendo console by Nintendo Power. They also listed it as the 20th best game on the Super NES. IGN listed it in their "Top 100 Games of All Time" at number 74 in 2003, and at number 91 in 2007. They later placed it as the 80th best Super NES game. It was named the 16th best game on the Super NES by GameDaily in 2008, while Game Informer listed it at number 131 in its "Top 200 Games of All Time" in 2009. Official Nintendo Magazine ranked the game number 61 on its February 2009 "100 Best Nintendo Games" list. In April 1996, Super Play listed it as the tenth greatest game for the Super NES. In 2018, Complex rated the game 77th on their "The Best Super Nintendo Games of All Time".  In 1995, Total! placed the game 20th on their Top 100 SNES Games. In 1996, GamesMaster listed Pilotwings 30th in its "Top 100 Games of All Time."

Pilotwings sold over two million copies worldwide by 1996. A sequel, Pilotwings 64, was released for the Nintendo 64 in 1996 as a launch title for its respective system. A second sequel for the Nintendo 64, which showed off the console's capabilities, was cancelled. In 2003, it was announced that Factor 5 was working on a GameCube incarnation of the Pilotwings series. Development was moved to Nintendo's Wii console shortly thereafter. However, an anonymous blogger claimed in late 2009 that Factor 5 had indeed finished working on it, but that Nintendo was not confident in publishing it. Nintendo finally announced a new title in the series, the Nintendo 3DS title Pilotwings Resort, at E3 2010. The new title was released as a launch title for the 3DS in North America on March 27, 2011.

The game has been featured in the Game On historical exhibition organized by the Barbican Centre, including a display at the Science Museum in London in 2007. Nintendo re-released Pilotwings on the Wii Virtual Console service in PAL regions and North America in 2009 and in Japan in 2010, and then on the Wii U Virtual Console in 2013. On September 5, 2019, the game became available on the Nintendo Switch Online service for the Nintendo Switch.

A stage based on Pilotwings makes an appearance in Super Smash Bros. for Wii U and Super Smash Bros. Ultimate. The stage combines elements from the original Super NES game and Pilotwings Resort.

Notes

References

External links 

 Official website

1990 video games
Flight simulation video games
Helicopter video games
New Nintendo 3DS games
Nintendo Entertainment Analysis and Development games
Parachuting video games
Pilotwings
Super Nintendo Entertainment System games
Video games about terrorism
Video games developed in Japan
Video games produced by Shigeru Miyamoto
Video games scored by Soyo Oka
Virtual Console games for Nintendo 3DS
Virtual Console games for Wii
Virtual Console games for Wii U
Single-player video games
Nintendo Switch Online games